Erland H. L. Almqvist (2 September 1912 – 20 September 1999) was a Swedish sailor who competed in the 1952 Summer Olympics. He was born in Stockholm. In 1952 he won the silver medal as crew member of the Swedish boat Tornado in the Dragon class. He died in Lidingö in 1999.

References

External links
 
 
 
 

1912 births
1999 deaths
Swedish male sailors (sport)
Olympic sailors of Sweden
Olympic silver medalists for Sweden
Olympic medalists in sailing
Sailors at the 1952 Summer Olympics – Dragon
Medalists at the 1952 Summer Olympics
Sportspeople from Stockholm